Chris Doyle is a multi-media artist who was born in Pennsylvania, in 1959. He is currently working and living in Brooklyn, New York, and Mexico City, Mexico. In his animation-based practice, he explores aspiration and progress, his main goal is to question “the foundation of a culture consumed by striving.” Through his work, he seeks to depict a world anxious in the shadow of a looming apocalypse, where environmental disaster and social inequities continue with increasing prevalence and complexity. To further drive his focus of restoration and conservation, his work often features industrial ruin, debris, and waste.

Education
Doyle received his B.F.A. at Boston College School of Arts and Sciences in 1981, and received his Master of Architecture from Harvard University's Graduate School of Design in 1985.

Work
Along his with enormous body of public work, his animations, paintings and drawings have been shown at MASSMoCA, MoMA P.S.1 Museum of Contemporary Art, Olana, The Brooklyn Museum of Art, The Queens Museum of Art, the Tang Museum, the Brooklyn Academy of Music, the Kupferstichkabinett Berlin, Germany, The Taubman Museum of Art, the Norton Museum in Palm Beach; the Schneider Museum of Art in Ashland Oregon; and Sculpture Center in New York. His animations have been included as part of the New York Video Festival at Lincoln Center, and the Melbourne International Arts Festival (2005).

Awards
Doyle received the Creative Capital Visual Arts Award in 2000. He is the recipient of a 2014 John Simon Guggenheim Foundation Fellowship and the 2014 Borusan Contemporary Art Collection Prize. Doyle has also been awarded grants from the Creative Capital Foundation, New York Foundation for the Arts, NYSCA, and the MAP Fund.

Notable works
Some of his major public projects have included BRIGHT CANYON, which was presented by the Times Square Alliance and used Times Square's electronic billboards to create the illusion of a beautiful canyon with waterfalls and animals (2014); "The Fluid", an animation installation  on dozens of screens inside the Fulton Street Subway Station (2017); LEAP, a video projection in New York City's Columbus Circle, presented by Creative Time (2000); and Commutable, where he gilded the commuter and bike path on the Williamsburg Bridge in 22k gold, presented by the Public Art Fund on the Lower East Side (1996).

Notable concepts

Cycles
In an interview with Patricia Maloney, Doyle refers to a painting series called The Course of an Empire, by Thomas Cole. From this painting series, which delves into how our understanding of our relationship with the environment has created a sense of menace. Doyle was intrigued by the cyclicality of civilization and created a series of animations, beginning with the "fulcrum moment of disaster," in his piece Apocalypse Management. In the original painting series, Cole depicts a brief rise to glory and followed by a sudden and dramatic collapse and overtaking by nature. This could be interpreted as an allusion to a situation quickly and without warning getting out of control. Likewise, Doyle also focused on how quickly something can get out of control, but also how it rebuilds. In his interview with Patricia Maloney, he discussed his interest in how our relationship with nature is constantly changing in a cyclical form, and he wanted to focus on the cultural interpretation of nature rather than nature itself.

Man and nature
In an interview with 21c Museum, Doyle goes into further detail about his view on the interaction of man and nature. Doyle says that he does not believe in "the duality between man and nature," and that everything we make, including all of our trash and pollution are just an extension of nature. He believes that we have been taught to think of ourselves as separate from animals and nature, and his pieces such as Bright Canyon are meant to connect people and make them feel whole with nature. These pieces psychologically could have a very positive effect on the viewer. According to the Journal of Environmental Psychology, even small exposure to "nature-related stimuli" can decrease anxiety, and even help one stop dwelling on persistent thoughts. Doyle's piece reconnected Times Square to the natural environment it had been before the city had been built, exposing any passer-by to the positive effects of being connected to nature.

Place at a specific time
In 1996, Doyle created the piece Commutable with the Public Art Fund in New York. The piece was $7,500 of 22k gold gilded on the stairway and bike path on the Manhattan side of the Williamsburg Bridge. As people used this path, they in turn tracked gold flakes throughout the surrounding areas. This piece was different from his usual work because instead of creating a piece that was for people to look at or walk around, he "wanted to do something people could use." He wanted this piece to bring attention to an area that was seemingly abandoned by the city after construction was halted on the bridge. Even though he knew the bridge would one day be demolished, he explained that it is not about making a monument, but about transforming a place at a specific time. Like other art exhibits that make use of a community or area, this piece was greatly appreciated by pedestrians walking and riding along the bridge. According to Joshua Guetzkow in his article "How the Arts Impact Communities", art pieces such as this help communities "build social capital by boosting individuals’ ability and motivation to be civically engaged, as well as building organizational capacity for effective action." By creating a venue that brought people together and brought attention to this "benighted" area, as Doyle calls it, he was able to make a positive impact on residents and quite possibly a sight that will persist in their memories.

Solo exhibitions

2017
Hollow and Swell, Catharine Clark Gallery, San Francisco, CA 
The Fluid, Fulton Street Station, MTA Arts for Transit, New York, NY 
In the Labyrinth, University of Michigan Museum of Art, Ann Arbor, MI 
Presto!, Presented by Converge 45, Portland, OR 
Dreams of Infinite Luster, 21C Museum Hotel, Durham, NC

2016
Recent Animation and Work on Paper, Texas Contemporary, Catharine Clark Gallery, Houston, TX 
Apocalypse Management, RL Window, Ryan Lee Gallery, New York, NY
Union, Collaboration with The Louisville Ballet and The Louisville Symphony Orchestra, Louisville, KY

2015
Animations from The Lightening. an outdoor projection at the Miami Project, Dec 1–6, 2015, Miami, FL
The Lightening, 50th Anniversary Project for Wave Hill, Riverdale, New York, April–May, 2015. (cat)
Landscape Fictions, Glyndor Gallery at Wave Hill, Bronx, NY (cat)

References

External links
Times Square Alliance : Chris Doyle Transforms the Concrete Jungle Of NYC’s Times Square Into a Flourishing Canyon with its Animal Inhabitants
Chris Doyle's Official Site
Chris Doyle's Commutable
Andrew Edlin Gallery NYC gallery representing the work of Chris Doyle
Wave Hill Puts Spotlight on Art to Celebrate Its Gardens and Lure Visitors (Published 2015)

Living people

1959 births
Harvard Graduate School of Design alumni
Morrissey College of Arts & Sciences alumni
Animators from Pennsylvania
Environmental artists